The Los Caminos Antiguos Scenic and Historic Byway is a  Back Country Byway and Colorado Scenic and Historic Byway located in Alamosa, Conejos, and Costilla counties, Colorado, USA. The byway explores the historic San Luis Valley of south-central Colorado including Great Sand Dunes National Park and Preserve; the Old Spanish National Historic Trail; historic Fort Garland, San Luis , the oldest town in Colorado; and the Cumbres and Toltec Scenic Railroad.

Route

Gallery

See also

History Colorado
List of scenic byways in Colorado
Scenic byways in the United States

Notes

References

External links

America's Scenic Byways: Colorado
Bureau of Land Management Back Country Byways
Colorado Department of Transportation
Colorado Scenic & Historic Byways Commission
Colorado Scenic & Historic Byways
Colorado Travel Map
Colorado Tourism Office
History Colorado

Colorado Scenic and Historic Byways
Bureau of Land Management Back Country Byways
Back Country Byways in Colorado
Great Sand Dunes National Park and Preserve
Rio Grande National Forest
Transportation in Colorado
Transportation in Alamosa County, Colorado
Transportation in Conejos County, Colorado
Transportation in Costilla County, Colorado
Tourist attractions in Colorado
Tourist attractions in Alamosa County, Colorado
Tourist attractions in Conejos County, Colorado
Tourist attractions in Costilla County, Colorado
U.S. Route 160
U.S. Route 285